Victor Township is one of nineteen townships in DeKalb County, Illinois, USA. As of the 2010 census, its population was 299 and it contained 130 housing units. Victor Township was formed from Clinton Township around 1853.

Geography

Cemeteries
 Victor Cemetery

Airports and landing strips
 Dewey

Demographics

School districts
 Indian Creek Community Unit District 425
 Leland Community Unit School District 1
 Somonauk Community Unit School District 432

Political districts
 Illinois's 14th congressional district
 State House District 70
 State Senate District 35

References
 
 US Census Bureau 2009 TIGER/Line Shapefiles
 US National Atlas

External links
 City-Data.com
 Illinois State Archives
 Township Officials of Illinois
 DeKalb County Official Site

Townships in DeKalb County, Illinois
Townships in Illinois